St. Luke's Medical Center – Quezon City is a hospital in Quezon City, Metro Manila, Philippines. Forming as a part of St. Luke's Medical Center group of hospitals, it was founded in 1903 by the American missionary Charles Henry Brent under the  Protestant Episcopal Church in the United States of America (PECUSA) as the third oldest American and Protestant hospital in the Philippines (first Protestant Episcopalian hospital in the country) after CPU–Iloilo Mission Hospital and Silliman University Medical Center.

Alongside with its sister medical center of the same name, the St. Luke's Medical Center - Global City at the Bonifacio Global City in Taguig, both hospitals are under the same management of the St. Luke's Medical Center Group and are affiliated with the Episcopal Church in the Philippines, but maintains to be independent. 

The managing entity of both hospitals is based in the Quezon City hospital and the Taguig hospital is a wholly owned corporation of the former.

St. Luke's serves also as an affiliated university hospital of Trinity University of Asia, the first Protestant Episcopalian university in Asia, and the St. Luke's College of Medicine.

Facilities

The hospital has a 650 bed-capacity. It also hosts medical equipment such as the 3-Tesla MRI, 1152-slice dual energy CT scanner, PET scanner and Cyclotron. It employs at least 1,700 doctors and about 2,600 non-medical staff.

Reception
The St. Luke's Medical Center in Quezon City is the first hospital in the Philippines and the second one in Asia to be accredited by the Joint Commission International. The hospital first earned the distinction in 2003 and the accreditation has been renewed at least four times

In 2013, German based accreditation organization, TEMOS gave an Excellence in Medical Tourism and Quality in International Patient Care certificate to the hospital in Quezon City. Its sister facility in Bonifacio Global City was also given the award.

References

External links
 

Hospitals in Quezon City
Protestant hospitals in the Philippines
Buildings and structures in Quezon City